Strahoninec is a municipality in Međimurje County, Croatia.

Strahoninec is the only village in the municipality. Also part of the municipality is the hamlet of Poleve, located just over a kilometre south of the village. In the 2011 census, the municipality had a population of 2,682. Of the entire population, a total of 2,645 people (98.6%) identified themselves as Croats.

The village of Strahoninec is located next to the southern limits of Čakovec, the county seat of Međimurje County, around 3 kilometres from the centre of the city. The north-eastern part of the village is connected with Savska Ves, while its western part is close to Nedelišće.

History

In 1478, the village was listed as Strahoninecz in the list of settlements belonging to the Čakovec area. In 1564, Judicatus Strahonincs was mentioned. At the time, a judicatus was an administrative division consisting of several rural municipalities. In 1672, Strahoninec was mentioned as part of the Nedelišće judicatus. In 1718, it belonged to the Mihovljan judicatus, but was again mentioned as part of the Nedelišće judicatus three years later, in 1721.

The first organised census in the Međimurje region took place in 1786. According to it, there were 44 houses in Strahoninec, accommodating 56 families and a population of 384. Another census took place in 1828. According to it, there were 48 houses in the village, accommodating a predominantly Roman Catholic population of 385. The name of the village in that census was Ztrahominec. It was derived from strah, the Croatian word for "fear", and minuti, which means "to pass" or "to go away". It was a reference to the people who travelled through the area. They were afraid of a large forest they had to go through after crossing the Drava, and their fears were gone once they entered the village.

In the 1828 census, the hamlet of Poleve was mentioned for the first time. However, neither its population nor the number of houses were mentioned. In 1868, the hamlet was mentioned as Polevo, and was part of the village of Strahoninec. In the 1910 census, the hamlet was mentioned under a Hungarian name, Szépmajor, and had a population of 91.

Strahoninec was also known by a Hungarian name, Nagyfalu, at the beginning of the 20th century. In the 1900 census, it had a population of 777. At the time, there were 724 Croats, 44 Hungarians and 8 Germans living in the village. In the 1910 census, the village had a population of 782. It was part of the Čakovec district of Zala County in the Kingdom of Hungary until the Treaty of Trianon was signed in 1920.

It then became part of the Kingdom of Yugoslavia. In 1921, Strahoninec became the seat of a municipality, which also included Kuršanec, Poleve and Totovec. In 1941, it became part of Hungary again, as the entire Međimurje region was annexed by the Hungarians until 1945. At the time, the village was known as Drávanagyfalu, which is still the name used for it in Hungarian. In 1941, it had a population of 1,212. The majority of the population identified themselves as Hungarians at the time.

After World War II, it became part of Croatia within the Federal People's Republic of Yugoslavia. In the 1953 census, the village of Strahoninec had a population of 1,386. At the time, it was the seat of a municipality, which also included the villages of Šandorovec and Totovec. In 1955, it became part of the Čakovec municipality.

The village developed quickly during the 1960s and 1970s. In the 1981 census, it had a population of 2,260, which grew to 2,580 in the 1991 census. Following the independence of Croatia, it was part of the wider area of the city of Čakovec. On 17 January 1997, Strahoninec became a separate municipality.

Gallery

References

External links
 The official website of the municipality 

Municipalities of Croatia
Populated places in Međimurje County